Function theory may refer to:

 Theory of functions of a real variable, the traditional name of real analysis, a branch of mathematical analysis dealing with the real numbers and real-valued functions of a real variable
 Theory of functions of a complex variable, the historical name for complex analysis, the branch of mathematical analysis that investigates functions of complex numbers
 Constructive function theory, the study of the connection between the smoothness of a function and its degree of approximation
 Geometric function theory, the study of geometric properties of analytic functions